Baspa Valley is a river valley that is said to be named after the Baspa River. It lies in the Kinnaur District of Himachal Pradesh, India. Sangla is a major town in the Baspa Valley, and the valley is also known as the Sangla Valley or Tukpa Valley. The villages inside the valley is Chitkul, Rakchham, Batseri, Sangla, Kamru; the old capital of Bushahr State and Chansu.

History 
The Baspa river is a tributary to the Sutlej river, and one may approach the Baspa Valley by taking a diversion at Karcham, which is in the entrance of valley at NH-05.  

It opens into Satluj valley downstream of tshong-tong river. Baspa valley offers numerous trekking trails to neighbouring valleys like Jalandrigad valley via Lamkhaga pass, Har ki dun valley via Borasu pass, Sangla to Netwar via Rupin pass and Pabbar valley via Buran pass. Yamrang la pass & Gugairang La are the two passes situated on Indo-China border.  

Baspa River has a 300MW hydroelectric power project at Karcham. The barrage for the project is at Kuppa (Kamru). The project has been operational since May 2003. Jaypee Group, a private sector conglomerate, built the project and later sold it to Jindal Power. 
Most of the annual run off the Baspa River is derived from glacier and snowmelt.

References

Geography of Kinnaur district
Valleys of Himachal Pradesh